Execution by firing squad, in the past sometimes called fusillading (from the French , rifle), is a method of capital punishment, particularly common in the military and in times of war. Some reasons for its use are that firearms are usually readily available and a gunshot to a vital organ, such as the brain or heart, most often will kill relatively quickly.

A firing squad is normally composed of several soldiers, all of whom are usually instructed to fire simultaneously, thus preventing both disruption of the process by one member and identification of who fired the lethal shot. To avoid disfigurement due to multiple shots to the head, the shooters are typically instructed to aim at the heart, sometimes aided by a paper or cloth target. The prisoner is typically blindfolded or hooded as well as restrained. Executions can be carried out with the condemned either standing or sitting. There is a tradition in some jurisdictions that such executions are carried out at first light or at sunrise. This gave rise to the phrase "shot at dawn".

Execution by firing squad is a specific practice that is distinct from other forms of execution by firearms, such as an execution by shot(s) to the back of the head or neck. However, the single shot by the squad's officer with a pistol (coup de grâce) is sometimes incorporated in a firing squad execution, particularly if the initial volley turns out not to be immediately fatal. Before the introduction of firearms, bows or crossbows were often used—Saint Sebastian is usually depicted as executed by a squad of Roman auxiliary archers in around AD 288; King Edmund the Martyr of East Anglia, by some accounts, was tied to a tree and executed by Viking archers on 20 November 869 or 870.

Military significance

The method is often the capital punishment or disciplinary means employed by military courts for crimes such as cowardice, desertion, espionage, murder, mutiny, or treason.

If the condemned prisoner is an ex-officer who is acknowledged to have shown bravery throughout their career, they may be afforded the privilege of giving the order to fire. An example of this is Marshal of France Michel Ney. As a means of insulting the condemned, however, past executions have had them shot in the back, denied blindfolds, or even tied to chairs. When Galeazzo Ciano, son-in-law of Benito Mussolini, and several other former Fascists who voted to remove Mussolini from power were executed, they were tied to chairs facing away from their executioners. By some reports, Ciano managed to twist his chair around at the last second to face them.

Blank cartridge
Sometimes, one or more soldiers of the firing squad may be issued a rifle containing a blank cartridge. In such cases, soldiers of the firing squad are not told beforehand whether they are using live ammunition. This is believed to reinforce the sense of diffusion of responsibility among the firing squad members. It provides each member with a measure of plausible deniability that they, personally, did not fire a bullet at all. For this reason, it is sometimes referred to as the "conscience round".

In practice however, firing a live round produces significant recoil, while firing a blank does not. This is especially significant with bolt-action rifles. As a result, it is not realistic to assume that, after the fact, trained soldiers will be unaware of which they shot. This is reflected in first-hand reports such as Pte. W. A. Quinton’s, who served in the British Army during the First World War and served on a firing squad in October 1915. Per his account, he and 11 colleagues were relieved of any live ammunition and their own rifles, then issued replacement firearms for the task at hand. After a short speech by an officer, the squad fired a volley at the condemned man. Quinton stated that "I had the satisfaction of knowing that as soon as I fired, the absence of any recoil [indicated] that I had merely fired a blank cartridge".

In more recent times, such as the 2010 execution of Ronnie Lee Gardner in Utah, US, one rifleman may be given a "dummy" cartridge containing a wax bullet, which provides a more realistic recoil.

By country

Argentina

Manuel Dorrego, a prominent Argentine statesman and soldier who governed Buenos Aires in the 1820s, was executed by firing squad on 12 December 1828 after being defeated in battle by Juan Lavalle and later convicted of treason.

Belgium

On 12 October 1915 a British nurse Edith Cavell was executed by a German firing squad at the Tir national shooting range at Schaerbeek after being convicted of "conveying troops to the enemy" during the First World War.

On 1 April 1916 a Belgian woman, Gabrielle Petit, was executed by a German firing squad at Schaerbeek after being convicted of spying for the British Secret Service during World War I.

During the Battle of the Bulge in World War II, three captured German spies were tried and executed by a U.S. firing squad at Henri-Chapelle on 23 December 1944. Thirteen other Germans were also tried and shot at either Henri-Chapelle or Huy. These executed spies took part in Waffen-SS commando Otto Skorzeny's Operation Greif, in which English-speaking German commandos operated behind U.S. lines, masquerading in U.S. uniforms and equipment.

Brazil

The Brazilian Constitution of 1988 expressly prohibits the usage of capital punishment in peacetime, but authorizes the use of the death penalty for military crimes committed during wartime. War needs to be declared formally, in accordance with international law and article 84, item 19 of the Federal Constitution, with due authorization from the Brazilian Congress. The Brazilian Code of Military Penal Law, in its chapter dealing with wartime offences, specifies the crimes that are subject to the death penalty. The death penalty is never the only possible sentence for a crime, and the punishment must be imposed by the military courts system. Per the norms of the Brazilian Code of Military Penal Procedure, the death penalty is carried out by firing squad.

Although Brazil still permits the use of capital punishment during wartime, no convicts were actually executed during Brazil's last military conflict, the Second World War. The military personnel sentenced to death during World War II had their sentences reduced by the President of the Republic.

Chile
Following the military overthrow of the democratically elected government of Salvador Allende in 1973, Chilean dictator Augusto Pinochet initiated a series of war tribunal trials against leftist people around the country. During the first months after his coup, hundreds of people were killed by firing squads and summary executions.

Cuba

Cuba, as part of its penal system, still utilizes death by firing squad, although the last recorded execution was in 2003. In January 1992 a Cuban exile convicted of "terrorism, sabotage and enemy propaganda" was executed by firing squad. The Council of the State noted that the punishment served as a deterrent and stated that the death penalty "fulfills a goal of overall prevention, especially when the idea is to stop such loathsome actions from being repeated, to deter others and so to prevent innocent human lives from being endangered in the future".

During the months following the triumph of the Cuban Revolution in 1959, soldiers of the Batista government and political opponents to the revolution were executed by firing squad.

Finland

The death penalty was widely used during and after the Finnish Civil War (January–May 1918); some 9,700 Finns and an unknown number of Russian volunteers on Red side were executed during the war or in its aftermath. Most executions were carried out by firing squads after the sentences were given by illegal or semi-legal courts martial. Only some 250 persons were sentenced to death in courts acting on legal authority.

During World War II some 500 persons were executed, half of them condemned spies. The usual causes for death penalty for Finnish citizens were treason and high treason (and to a lesser extent cowardice and disobedience, applicable for military personnel). Almost all cases of capital punishment were tried by court-martial. Usually the executions were carried out by the regimental military police platoon, or by the local military police in the case of spies. One Finn, Toivo Koljonen, was executed for a civilian crime (six murders). Most executions occurred in 1941 and during the Soviet Summer Offensive in 1944. The last death sentences were given in 1945 for murder, but later commuted to life imprisonment.

The death penalty was abolished by Finnish law in 1949 for crimes committed during peacetime, and in 1972 for all crimes. Finland is party to the Optional protocol of the International Covenant on Civil and Political Rights, forbidding the use of the death penalty in all circumstances.

France

Pte. Thomas Highgate was the first British soldier to be convicted of desertion and executed by firing squad in September 1914 at Tournan-en-Brie during World War I. In October 1916 Pte. Harry Farr was shot for cowardice at Carnoy, which was later suspected to be acoustic shock. Highgate and Farr, along with 304 other British and Imperial troops who were executed for similar offenses, were listed at the Shot at Dawn Memorial which was erected to honor them.

On 15 October 1917 Dutch exotic dancer Mata Hari was executed by a French firing squad at Château de Vincennes castle in the town of Vincennes after being convicted of spying for Germany during World War I.

During World War II, on 24 September 1944, Josef Wende and Stephan Kortas, two Poles drafted into the German army, crossed the Moselle Rivers behind U.S. lines in civilian clothes to observe Allied strength and were to rejoin their own army on the same day. However, they were discovered by the Americans and arrested. On 18 October 1944 they were found guilty of espionage by a U.S. military commission and sentenced to death. On 11 November 1944 they were shot in the garden of a farmhouse at Toul. The footage of Wende's execution as well as Kortas's is shown in these links.

On 31 January 1945, U.S. Army Pvt. Edward "Eddie" Slovik was executed by firing squad for desertion near the village of Sainte-Marie-aux-Mines. He was the first American soldier executed for such offense since the American Civil War.

On 15 October 1945 Pierre Laval, the puppet leader of Nazi-occupied Vichy France, was executed for treason at Fresnes Prison in Paris.

On 11 March 1963 Jean Bastien-Thiry was the last person to be executed by firing squad for a failed attempt to assassinate French president Charles de Gaulle.

Indonesia

Execution by firing squad is the capital punishment method used in Indonesia. The following persons were executed (reported by BBC World Service) by firing squad on 29 April 2015 following convictions for drug offences: two Australians, Myuran Sukumaran and Andrew Chan, the Ghanaian Martin Anderson, the Indonesian Zainal Abidin bin Mgs Mahmud Badarudin, three Nigerians: Raheem Agbaje Salami, Sylvester Obiekwe Nwolise and Okwudili Oyatanze, as well as Brazilian Rodrigo Gularte.

In 2006 Fabianus Tibo, Dominggus da Silva and Marinus Riwu were executed. Nigerian drug smugglers Samuel Iwachekwu Okoye and Hansen Anthoni Nwaolisa were executed in June 2008 in Nusakambangan Island. Five months later three men convicted for the 2002 Bali bombing—Amrozi, Imam Samudra and Ali Ghufron—were executed on the same spot in Nusakambangan. In January 2013 56-year-old British woman Lindsay Sandiford was sentenced to execution by firing squad for importing a large amount of cocaine; she lost her appeal against her sentence in April 2013. On 18 January 2015, under the new leadership of Joko Widodo, six people sentenced to death for producing and smuggling drugs into Indonesia were executed at Nusa Kambangan Penitentiary shortly after midnight.

Ireland

Following the 1916 Easter Rising in Ireland, 15 of the 16 leaders who were executed were shot by British military authorities under martial law. The executions have often been cited as a reason for how the Rising managed to galvanise public support in Ireland after the failed rebellion.

Following the Anglo-Irish Treaty, a split in the government and the Dail led to a Civil War during which the Free State Government sanctioned the executions by firing squad of 81 persons. Included in those numbers were some prominent prisoners who were executed without trial as reprisals.

Italy

Italy had used the firing squad as its only form of death penalty, both for civilians and military, since the unification of the country in 1861. The death penalty was abolished completely by both Italian Houses of Parliament in 1889 but revived under the Italian dictatorship of Benito Mussolini in 1926. Mussolini was himself shot in the last days of World War Two.

On 1 December 1945 Anton Dostler, the first German general to be tried for war crimes, was executed by a U.S. firing squad in Aversa after being found guilty by a U.S. military tribunal of ordering the killing of 15 U.S. prisoners of war in Italy during World War II.

The last execution took place on 4 March 1947, as Francesco La Barbera, Giovanni Puleo and Giovanni D'Ignoti, sentenced to death on multiple accounts of robbery and murder, faced the firing squad at the range of Basse di Stura, near Turin. Soon after the Constitution of the newly proclaimed Republic prohibited the death penalty except for some crimes, like high treason, during wartime; no one was sentenced to death after 1947. In 2007 the Constitution was amended to ban the death penalty altogether.

Malta
Firing squads were used during the periods of French and British control in Malta. Ringleaders of rebellions were often shot dead by firing squad during the French period, with perhaps the most notable examples being Dun Mikiel Xerri and other patriots in 1799.

The British also used the practice briefly, and for the last time in 1813, when two men were shot separately outside the courthouse after being convicted of failing to report their infection of plague to the authorities.

Mexico

During the Mexican Independence War, several Independentist generals (such as Miguel Hidalgo and José María Morelos) were executed by Spanish firing squads. Also, Emperor Maximilian I of Mexico and two of his generals were executed in the Cerro de las Campanas after the Juaristas took control of Mexico in 1867. Manet immortalized the execution in a now-famous painting, The Execution of Emperor Maximilian; he painted at least three versions.

Firing-squad execution was the most common way to carry out a death sentence in Mexico, especially during the Mexican Revolution and the Cristero War. An example of that is in the attempted execution of Wenseslao Moguel, who survived being shot ten times—once at point-blank range—because he fought under Pancho Villa. After these events, the death sentence was imposed for fewer types of crimes in Article 22 of the Mexican Constitution; however, in 1917 capital punishment was abolished completely.

Netherlands

During the Nazi occupation in World War II some 3,000 persons were executed by German firing squads. The victims were sometimes sentenced by a military court; in other cases they were hostages or arbitrary pedestrians who were executed publicly to intimidate the population. After the attack on high-ranking German officer Hanns Albin Rauter, about 300 people were executed publicly as reprisal against resistance movements. Rauter himself was executed near Scheveningen on 12 January 1949, following his conviction for war crimes. Anton Mussert, a Dutch Nazi leader, was sentenced to death by firing squad and executed in the dunes near The Hague on 7 May 1946.

While under Allied guard in Amsterdam, and five days after the capitulation of Nazi Germany, two German Navy deserters were shot by a firing squad composed of other German prisoners kept in the Canadian-run prisoner-of-war camp. The men were lined up against the wall of an air raid shelter near an abandoned Ford Motor Company assembly plant in the presence of Canadian military.

Nigeria
Nigeria executes criminals who committed armed robberies—such as Ishola Oyenusi, Lawrence Anini and Osisikankwu—as well as military officers convicted of plotting coups against the government, such as Buka Suka Dimka and Maj. Gideon Orkar, by firing squad.

Norway

Vidkun Quisling, the leader of the collaborationist Nasjonal Samling Party and president of Norway during the German occupation in World War II, was sentenced to death for treason and executed by firing squad on 24 October 1945 at the Akershus Fortress.

Philippines

Jose Rizal was executed by firing squad on the morning of 30 December 1896, in what is now Rizal Park, where his remains have since been placed.

During the Marcos administration, drug trafficking was punishable by firing-squad execution, as was done to Lim Seng. Execution by firing squad was later replaced by the electric chair, then lethal injection. On 24 June 2006, President Gloria Macapagal Arroyo abolished capital punishment through the enactment of Republic Act No. 9346. Existing death row inmates, who numbered in the thousands, were eventually given life sentences or reclusion perpetua instead.

Romania
Nicolae Ceaușescu was executed by firing squad alongside his wife while singing the Communist Internationale following a show trial, bringing an end to the Romanian Revolution, on Christmas Day, 1989.

Russia/USSR
In Imperial Russia, firing squads were used in the army for executions during combat on the orders of military tribunals.

In the Soviet Union, from the very earliest days, the bullet to the back of the head, in front of a ready-dug burial trench was by far the most common practice. It became especially widely used during the Great Purge.

Saudi Arabia
Executions in Saudi Arabia are usually carried out by beheading; however, at times other methods have been used. Al-Beshi, a Saudi executioner, has said that he has conducted some executions by shooting. Mishaal bint Fahd bin Mohammed Al Saud, a Saudi princess, was also executed in the same way.

South Africa

Australian soldiers Harry "Breaker" Morant and Peter Handcock were executed by a British firing squad in the South African Republic on 27 February 1902 for war crimes during the Second Boer War.

United Arab Emirates

In the United Arab Emirates, firing squad is the preferred method of execution.

United Kingdom

The standard method of execution in the United Kingdom was hanging. Execution by firing squad was limited to times of war, armed insurrection and in the military, although it is now outlawed in all circumstances, along with all other forms of capital punishment.

The Tower of London was used during both World Wars for executions. During World War I, eleven captured German spies were shot between 1914 and 1916: nine on the Tower's rifle range and two in the Tower Ditch, all of whom were buried in East London Cemetery, in Plaistow, London. On 15 August 1941, the last execution at the Tower was that of German Cpl. Josef Jakobs, shot for espionage during World War II.

The United States Army took over Shepton Mallet prison in Somerset in 1942, renaming it Disciplinary Training Center No.1 and housing troops convicted of offences across Europe. There were eighteen executions at the prison, two of them by firing squad for murder: Pvt. Alexander Miranda on 30 May 1944 and Pvt. Benjamin Pygate on 28 November 1944. Locals complained about the noise, as the executions took place in the prison yard at 1:00am.

Since the 1960s, there has been some controversy concerning the 346 British and Imperial troops—including 25 Canadians, 22 Irish and 5 New Zealanders—shot for desertion, murder, cowardice and other offences during World War I, some of whom are now thought to have been suffering from combat stress reaction or post-traumatic stress disorder ("shell-shock", as it was then known). This led to organisations such as the Shot at Dawn Campaign being set up in later years to try to uncover just why these soldiers were executed. The Shot at Dawn Memorial was erected at Staffordshire to honour these soldiers. In August 2006 it was announced that 306 of these soldiers would receive posthumous pardons.

United States

During the American War of Independence, General George Washington approved a sentence of death by firing squad, but the prisoner was later pardoned.

During the American Civil War, 433 of the 573 men executed were shot dead by a firing squad: 186 of the 267 executed by the Union Army, and 247 of the 306 executed by the Confederate Army.

In 1913, Andriza Mircovich became the first and only inmate in Nevada to be executed by shooting. After the warden of Nevada State Prison could not find five men to form a firing squad, a shooting machine was built to carry out Mircovich's execution.

John W. Deering allowed an electrocardiogram recording of the effect of gunshot wounds on his heart during his 1938 execution by firing squad, and afterwards his body was donated to the University of Utah School of Medicine, at his request.

Since 1960 there have been four executions by firing squad, all in Utah: The 1960 execution of James W. Rodgers, Gary Gilmore's execution in 1977, and John Albert Taylor in 1996, who chose a firing squad for his execution, according to The New York Times, "to make a statement that Utah was sanctioning murder". However, a 2010 article for the British newspaper The Times quotes Taylor justifying his choice because he did not want to "flop around like a dying fish" during a lethal injection. Ronnie Lee Gardner was executed by firing squad in 2010, having said he preferred this method of execution because of his "Mormon heritage". Gardner also felt that lawmakers were trying to eliminate the firing squad, in opposition to popular opinion in Utah, because of concern over the state's image in the 2002 Winter Olympics.

Execution by firing squad was banned in Utah in 2004, but as the ban was not retroactive, three inmates on Utah's death row have the firing squad set as their method of execution. Idaho banned execution by firing squad in 2009, temporarily leaving Oklahoma as the only state utilizing this method of execution (and only as a secondary method).

Reluctance by drug companies to see their drugs used to kill people has led to a shortage of the commonly used lethal injection drugs. In March 2015, Utah enacted legislation allowing for execution by firing squad if the drugs they use are unavailable. Several other states are also exploring a return to the firing squad. Thus, after waning in both use and popularity in recent decades, as of 2022, firing squad executions appear to be at least anecdotally regaining popularity as an alternative to lethal injection.

Justice Sonia Sotomayor argued in Arthur v. Dunn (2017): "In addition to being near instant, death by shooting may also be comparatively painless. [...] And historically, the firing squad has yielded significantly fewer botched executions."

On January 30, 2019, South Carolina's Senate voted 26–13 in favor of a revived proposal to bring back the electric chair and add firing squads to its execution options. On May 14, 2021, South Carolina Governor Henry McMaster signed a bill into law which brought back the electric chair as the default method of execution (in the event lethal injection was unavailable) and added the firing squad to the list of execution options. South Carolina has not performed executions in over a decade, and its lethal injection drugs expired in 2013. Pharmaceutical companies have since refused to sell drugs for lethal injection.

On April 7, 2022, the South Carolina Supreme Court scheduled the execution of Richard Bernard Moore for April 29, 2022. On April 15, 2022, Moore chose to be executed by firing squad instead of the electric chair, however, his execution was later stayed by the South Carolina Supreme Court.

As of 2023, Mississippi, Oklahoma, South Carolina, and Utah uses the firing squad for the death penalty. In 2023, Idaho and Tennessee were debating about using firing squad.

See also
 Bullet fee
 Use of capital punishment by country

Notes and references

Further reading
 Moore, William, The Thin Yellow Line, Wordsworth Editions Ltd, 1974
 Putkowski and Sykes, Shot at Dawn, Leo Cooper, 2006
 Hughs-Wilson, John and Corns, Cathryn M, Blindfold and Alone: British Military Executions in the Great War, Cassell, 2005
 Johnson, David, Executed at Dawn: The British Firing Squads of the First World War, History Press, 2015

External links

 Firing Squad Execution of a Civil War Deserter Described in an 1861 Newspaper
 The Shot at Dawn Campaign with biographies of executed British and Commonwealth soldiers
 Death by Firing Squad – slideshow by The First Post
 Nazis Meet the Firing Squad  – slideshow by Life magazine

Firing squad
Capital punishment